The 2023 Nigerian Senate elections in Sokoto State will be held on 25 February 2023, to elect the 3 federal Senators from Sokoto State, one from each of the state's three senatorial districts. The elections will coincide with the 2023 presidential election, as well as other elections to the Senate and elections to the House of Representatives; with state elections being held two weeks later. Primaries were held between 4 April and 9 June 2022.

Background
In the previous Senate elections, all three incumbent senators were returned with Abdullahi Ibrahim Gobir (APC-East) winning re-election with 54% of the vote and Aliyu Magatakarda Wamakko (APC-Central) winning re-election with 54% as well while Ibrahim Abdullahi Danbaba (PDP-South) was returned after a court ruling later in 2019. The senatorial results were an example of the state's competitiveness as the APC won most House of Representatives seats and won a majority in the state House of Assembly but the PDP held the governorship even though Buhari won the state in the presidential election.

Overview

Summary

Sokoto East 

The Sokoto East Senatorial District covers the local government areas of Gada, Goronyo, Gwadabawa, Illela, Isa, Rabah, Sabon Birni, and Wurno. Incumbent Abdullahi Ibrahim Gobir (APC) was elected with 54.2% of the vote in 2019. Ibrahim Gobir opted to run for governor of Sokoto State instead of seeking re-election; he came second in the APC gubernatorial primary.

General election

Results

Sokoto North 

The Sokoto North Senatorial District covers the local government areas of Binji, Gudu, Kware, Silame, Sokoto North, Sokoto South, Tangaza, and Wamako. Incumbent Aliyu Magatakarda Wamakko (APC), who was elected with 54.5% of the vote in 2019, is seeking re-election.

General election

Results

Sokoto South 

The Sokoto South Senatorial District covers the local government areas of Bodinga, Dange Shuni, Kebbe, Shagari, Tambuwal, Tureta, and Yabo. In the 2019 election, Abubakar Shehu Tambuwal (APC) initially won and was sworn in as senator in June; however, his election was overturned in October and the victory awarded to Ibrahim Abdullahi Danbaba (PDP). In April 2022, Abdullahi Danbaba defected to the APC and he is seeking re-election.

General election

Results

Notes

See also 
 2023 Nigerian Senate election
 2023 Nigerian elections
 2023 Sokoto State elections

References 

Sokoto State senatorial elections
2023 Sokoto State elections
Sokoto State Senate elections